The Council elections held in Wolverhampton on Thursday 3 May 1990 were one third, and 20 of the 60 seats were up for election.

During the 1990 election the Conservative Party gained Tettenhall Regis from a Liberal candidate.

1990 saw a huge decline in candidates from the rump SDP and Liberal Party, with only 1 from each standing. The Liberal Democrats contested most of the remaining wards. The Labour Party retained its majority and control of the council.

Prior to the election the constitution of the Council was:

Conservative 23
Labour 31
Lib Dem 5
Other 1

Following the election the constitution of the Council was:

Conservative 24
Labour 31
Lib Dem 5

Election result

1990
1990 English local elections
1990s in the West Midlands (county)